The cockatiel (Nymphicus hollandicus), also known as the weero/weiro or quarrion, is a medium-sized parrot that is a member of its own branch of the cockatoo family endemic to Australia. They are prized as household pets and companion parrots throughout the world and are relatively easy to breed. As a caged bird, cockatiels are second in popularity only to the budgerigar.

The cockatiel is the only member of the genus Nymphicus. It was previously unclear whether the cockatiel is a crested parakeet or small cockatoo; however, more recent molecular studies have assigned it to its own subfamily, Nymphicinae. It is, therefore, now classified as the smallest subfamily of the Cacatuidae (cockatoo family). Cockatiels are native to Australia, favouring the Australian wetlands, scrublands, and bushlands.

Taxonomy and etymology 
Originally described by Scottish writer and naturalist Robert Kerr in 1793 as Psittacus hollandicus, the cockatiel (or cockateel)  was moved to its own genus, Nymphicus, by Wagler in 1832. Its genus name reflects the experience of one of the earliest groups of Europeans to see the birds in their native habitat; the travellers thought the birds were so beautiful that they named them after mythical nymphs. The specific name hollandicus refers to New Holland, a historic name for Australia.

Its biological relationships were for a long time uncertain; it is now placed in a monotypic subfamily Nymphicinae, but was sometimes in the past classified among the Platycercinae, the broad-tailed parrots. This issue was settled with molecular studies. A 1984 study of protein allozymes signalled its closer relationship to cockatoos than to other parrots, and mitochondrial 12S rRNA sequence data places it among the Calyptorhynchinae (dark cockatoos) subfamily. The unique, parakeet (meaning long-tailed parrot) morphological feature is a consequence of the decrease in size and accompanying change of ecological niche.

Sequence analysis of intron 7 of the nuclear β-fibrinogen gene, on the other hand, indicates that it may yet be distinct enough as to warrant recognition of the Nymphicinae rather than inclusion of the genus in the Calyptorhynchinae.

The cockatiel is now biologically classified as a genuine member of Cacatuidae on account of sharing all of the cockatoo family's biological features, namely, the erectile crest, a gallbladder, powder down, suppressed cloudy-layer (which precludes the display of blue and green structural colours), and facial feathers covering the sides of the beak, all of which are rarely found outside the family Cacatuidae.  This biological relation to other cockatoos is further supported by the existence of at least one documented case of a successful hybrid between a cockatiel and a galah, another cockatoo species.

Description 

The cockatiel's distinctive crest expresses the animal's emotional state. The crest is dramatically vertical when the cockatiel is startled or excited, gently oblique in its neutral or relaxed state, and flattened close to the head when the animal is angry or defensive. The crest is also held flat but protrudes outward in the back when the cockatiel is trying to appear alluring or flirtatious. When the cockatiel is tired, the crest is seen positioned halfway upwards, with the tip of the crest usually curling upward. In contrast to most cockatoos, the cockatiel has long tail feathers roughly making up half of its total length.

The "normal grey" or "wild-type" cockatiel's plumage is primarily grey with prominent white flashes on the outer edges of each wing. The face of the male is yellow or white, while the face of the female is primarily grey or light grey, and both sexes feature a round orange area on both ears, often referred to as "cheddar cheeks". This orange colouration is generally vibrant in adult males, and often quite muted in females. Visual sexing is often possible with this variant of the bird.

Cockatiels are relatively vocal birds, the calls of the male being more varied than that of the female. Cockatiels can be taught to sing specific melodies, to the extent that some cockatiels have been demonstrated synchronizing their melodies with the songs of humans, and speak many words and phrases. They have also learned to imitate certain human or environmental sounds without being taught how to do so.

Sexual dimorphism 
Most wild cockatiel chicks and juveniles look female, and are virtually indistinguishable from the time of hatching until their first moulting. They display horizontal yellow stripes or bars on the ventral surface of their tail feathers, yellow spots on the ventral surface of the primary flight feathers of their wings, a grey coloured crest and face, and a dull orange patch on each of their cheeks. However some modernday mutations are sexlinked and the male and female chicks are easily distinguishable as soon as their feathers come in. 

Adult cockatiels with common coloring (grey body with yellow head) are sexually dimorphic, though to a lesser degree than many other avian species. This is only evident after the first moulting, typically occurring about six to nine months after hatching: the male loses the white or yellow barring and spots on the underside of his tail feathers and wings. The grey feathers on his cheeks and crest are replaced by bright yellow feathers, while the orange cheek patch becomes brighter and more distinct. The face and crest of the female will typically remain mostly grey with a yellowish tint, and a less vibrant orange cheek patch. Additionally, the female commonly retains the horizontal barring on the underside of her tail feathers.

The colour in cockatiels is derived from two pigments: melanin (which provides the grey colour in the feathers, eyes, beak, and feet), and psittacofulvins (which provide the yellow colour on the face and tail and the orange colour of the cheek patch). The grey colour of the melanin overrides the yellow and orange of the psittacofulvins when both are present.

The melanin content decreases in the face of the males as they mature, allowing the yellow and orange psittacofulvins to be more visible, while an increase in melanin content in the tail causes the disappearance of the horizontal yellow tail bars.

In addition to these visible characteristics, the vocalisation of adult males is typically louder and more complex than that of females. But like most things this isn't a hard and fast rule.

Colour mutations 

Worldwide there are currently 22 cockatiel colour mutations established in aviculture, of which eight are exclusive to Australia. Mutations in captivity have emerged in various colours, some quite different from those observed in nature. Wild cockatiels are grey with visible differences between males and females. Male grey cockatiels typically have yellow heads while the female has a grey head. Juveniles tend to look like females with pinker beaks. The pied mutation first appeared in California in 1949. This mutation is a blotch of colour on an otherwise solid-coloured bird. For example, this may appear as a grey blotch on a yellow cockatiel.

Lutino colouration was first seen in 1958. These birds lack the grey of their wild counterparts and are white to soft yellow. This is a popular colour; due to inbreeding, these cockatiels often have a small bald patch behind their crests. The cinnamon mutation, first seen in the 1950s, is very similar in appearance to the grey; however, these birds have a warmer, browner colouring. Pearling was first seen in 1967. This is seen as a feather of one colour with a different coloured edge, such as grey feathers with yellow tips. This distinctive pattern is on a bird's wings or back. The albino colour mutation is a lack of pigment. These birds are white with red eyes. Fallow cockatiels first appeared sometime in the 1970s. This mutation shows as a bird with cinnamon colouring with yellow sections. Other mutations include emerald/olive, dominant and recessive silver, and mutations exclusive to Australia: Australian fallow, faded (west coast silver), dilute/pastel silver (east coast silver), silver spangle (edged dilute), platinum, suffused (Australian olive), and pewter. Other mutations, such as face altering mutations, include whiteface, dominant yellow cheek, sex-linked yellow cheek, gold cheek, cream face, and the Australian yellow cheek.

Cockatiel colour mutations can become even more complex as one bird can have multiple colour mutations. For example, a yellow lutino cockatiel may have pearling – white spots on its back and wings. This is a double mutation. An example of a quadruple mutation would be cinnamon cockatiel with yellowface colouring with pearling and pied markings.

Distribution and habitat 

Cockatiels are native to Australia, where they are found largely in arid or semi-arid country but always close to water. Largely nomadic, the species will move to where food and water is available. They are typically seen in pairs or small flocks. Sometimes, hundreds will flock around a single body of water. Wild cockatiels typically eat seeds, particularly Acacia, wheat, sunflower and Sorghum. To many farmers' dismay, they often eat cultivated crops. They are absent from the most fertile southwest and southeast corners of the country, the deepest Western Australian deserts, and Cape York Peninsula. They are the only cockatoo species which can sometimes reproduce in the end of their first year.

Breeding 
Breeding is triggered by seasonal rainfall. Cockatiels nest in tree hollows near a source of fresh water, often in eucalyptus trees. The hen lays 4-7 eggs - one every other day, which she incubates for 17–23 days. The chicks fledge after 5 weeks.

Life span 
The cockatiel's life span in captivity is generally given as 16 to 25 years, though it is sometimes given as short as 10 to 15 years, and there are reports of cockatiels living as long as 32 years, the oldest confirmed specimen reported being 36 years old.

See also 
 Normal grey cockatiel
 Cockatiel colour genetics
 Companion parrot
 Pied cockatiel
 Lutino cockatiel
 Budgerigar
 White-faced cockatiel
 Cockatoo

References

Further reading 
 Astuti, Dwi (2004?): A phylogeny of cockatoos (Aves: Psittaciformes) inferred from DNA sequences of the seventh intron of nuclear β-fibrinogen gene. Doctoral work, Graduate School of Environmental Earth Science, Hokkaido University, Japan. PDF fulltext
 
 Flegg, Jim (2002): Photographic Field Guide: Birds of Australia. Reed New Holland, Sydney & London.

External links 

 
 Inte Onsman's MUTAVI Research & Advice Group
 Cockatiels – National Cockatiel Society
 Cockatiel Information Forum and Bulletin Board – Talk Cockatiels
 Videos, images and sounds – Internet Bird Collection

 
Calyptorhynchinae
Endemic birds of Australia
Domesticated birds
Parrots of Oceania
Talking birds
Birds described in 1792
Articles containing video clips
Taxa named by Robert Kerr (writer)